Hymenogadus is a genus of rattails, marine fish.

Species
There are currently 2 recognized species in this genus:
 Hymenogadus gracilis Gilbert & Hubbs, 1920 (Graceful grenadier) 
 Hymenogadus tenuis Gilbert & Hubbs, 1917 (Slender grenadier)

References

Macrouridae